Allison Mansion, also known as Riverdale, is a historic home located on the campus of Marian University at Indianapolis, Marion County, Indiana. It was built between 1911 and 1914, and is a large two-story, Arts and Crafts style red brick mansion with a red tile roof. The house features a sunken conservatory, porte cochere, and sunken white marble aviary.

The house was built by businessman and auto racing pioneer James A. Allison.

It was added to the National Register of Historic Places in 1970.

References

External links

Houses on the National Register of Historic Places in Indiana
Bungalow architecture in Indiana
Houses completed in 1914
Houses in Indianapolis
National Register of Historic Places in Indianapolis